DAB BNP Paribas is a brand of the German branch of the French major bank BNP Paribas with business premises in Munich. The BNP Paribas brand for independent asset managers, fund brokers, investment advisers and institutional clients was founded on 18 January 1994 as the first discount broker in Germany, trading under Direkt Anlage- und Vermögensverwaltungs-GmbH, and started operations in May 1994 as Direkt Anlage Bank GmbH (DAB). As of 1 January 2016, the operating private customer business was transferred to the BNP Paribas S.A. branch Germany. On 12/13 November 2016, the DAB bank's online portal was shut down and all private customers transferred to Consorsbank.

Business model
The DAB is a direct bank that offers private individuals a free custody account. All common securities can be traded and stored via the bank. In addition, it advertises since February 2013 with a renewed banking offer with a free checking account in the center. As one of the first institutes to operate on the market without its own branch system, the DAB bank is competing with, among others, Comdirect, a subsidiary of Commerzbank. Other direct-bank competitors in Germany include ING-DiBa, Consorsbank, Sparkassen Broker and 1822direkt.

Unlike its competitors, DAB has long renounced transaction numbers (TAN) and instead worked with a so-called trader password. Since the beginning of 2010, a system with a transaction number in the form of the mTAN procedure is offered.

In addition to its private clients, DAB has also been in charge of financial intermediaries such as asset managers, fund brokers and investment advisers as well as banks and savings banks since its foundation. It offers institutional customers a central depository for securities of all asset classes. The fully integrated securities trading platform enables the trading of all types of securities at home and abroad in all common currencies via a custody account. With more than 9,000 funds of more than 200 CAGs, the DAB is one of the most important fund platforms for institutional investors in Europe.

After "the stock boom around the turn of the millennium and the significantly decreased order numbers, it had missed the change from pure online broker to digital full bank." In that course, the parent company BNP Paribas reorganized the business model in the context of the 1 January 2016 transfer of the operative business of the DAB bank to the BNP Paribas branch Germany. Deposits of Volkswagen Bank will continue to be held at the DAB BNP Paribas in Munich.

Management
The company is managed by Kai Friedrich (CEO).

Stock market
In 1999, the DAB bank was placed on the stock exchange. The company was listed in the Prime Standard. In 2001, the bank was listed as part of the acquisition of the French online broker Selftrade on the Nouveau Marché (New Market) of the Paris Stock Exchange - the delisting in France took place in 2010.

As part of the takeover by BNP Paribas, the remaining minority shareholders were resigned and excluded by squeeze-out. The listing ended on 27 July 2015.

Affiliation
The institute was founded as a subsidiary of Bayerische Hypotheken- und Wechsel-Bank, which merged with Bayerische Vereinsbank in 1998 to form Bayerische Hypo- und Vereinsbank. In 2005 it was taken over by Unicredit Bank.

As of 28 February 2013, Unicredit Bank held 81.39% of the DAB bank shares, with 18.61% in free float.

At the beginning of August 2014, the French major bank BNP Paribas, which also owns Consorsbank, acquired an 81.4% stake for € 354 million. According to initial planning, it should have come to a fusion of the brands DAB bank and Consorsbank by the end of 2014 in Germany, but the merger with the DAB was completed in early 2016. The DAB bank thus had the same fate as the Consorsbank, it was integrated into the BNP Paribas S.A. branch Germany.

DAB was a member of the Cash Group until 31 January 2015.

Statistics
DAB is currently one of the leading direct banks in Germany in the securities business, in terms of client numbers and client assets. As of 31 December 2012, the DAB Bank Group had 597,128 customers, for which it managed 615,288 accounts with a combined client asset of €28,38 billion. In 2012, it conducted 4,2 million customer transactions.

History
 1994: Founding of the Direkt Anlage Bank (DAB) as the first direct broker in Germany.
 1996: Introduction of online banking.
 1997: DAB becomes a stock corporation
 1998: Through the DAB second trading DAB becomes the first discount broker with an off-exchange trading platform
 1999: The DAB is listed on the stock exchange in the Nouveau Marché (New Market) segment; from 20 March 2000 to 24 March 2003 NEMAX 50 is included in its selection index.
 2000: Deletion of deposit and account maintenance fee.
 2001: Renaming to DAB Bank as part of the acquisition of Direct Brokers Selftrade.
 2002: Selftrade is sold together with the DAB Bank (Switzerland). Purchase of the Austrian direktanlage.at by the Bank Austria.
 2004: Acquisition of FondsServiceBank GmbH
 2009: Sale of FondsServiceBank to Fondsdepot Bank, Hof
 2015: Squeeze-out of the remaining small shareholders, the bank now belongs exclusively to BNP * Paribas
 2016: The operative business is transferred to the BNP Paribas S.A. branch Germany. The business of the DAB Bank will be continued under the Consorsbank brand, which is also part of the BNP Paribas-Group. Thus, the brand DAB Bank disappears from the market.

References

External links
 Official Website

Banks of Germany
Cooperative banks of Germany
Corporate finance
Companies based in Munich
German companies established in 1994
Banks established in 1994
BNP Paribas